Alfred Lewis Enoch (born 2 December 1988) is a British-Brazilian actor. He is best known for playing Dean Thomas in the Harry Potter film series and Wes Gibbins in the ABC legal thriller television series How to Get Away with Murder.

Early life and education
Enoch was born on 2 December 1988 in the Westminster district of London, to actor William Russell and his second wife, Etheline Margareth Lewis, a Barbadian Brazilian doctor. He has three half-siblings from his father's previous marriage. Enoch holds dual British and Brazilian citizenship. He lived with his parents in southern France when he was two or three. He was educated at Westminster School, a historic public school in Westminster.

Enoch is a fluent speaker of English, French, Portuguese, and Spanish, and graduated from the Queen's College, Oxford with a Bachelor of Arts in Modern Languages.

Career

In 2001, he was cast as Dean Thomas in Harry Potter and the Philosopher's Stone. He appeared in seven of the eight Harry Potter films. He also voiced the character in video games.

After the Harry Potter films, Enoch appeared in a number of plays throughout London including Coriolanus, Timon of Athens, Antigone, Happy New. He played Bainbridge, the Bloody Guardsman, in the Sherlock episode, "The Sign of Three".

In 2014, Enoch began starring as Wes Gibbins in the ABC legal thriller series How to Get Away with Murder, produced by Shonda Rhimes.

In 2016, Enoch played Edgar/Poor Tom in the well-received Talawa Theatre Company and Manchester Royal Exchange co-production of King Lear, for which he garnered much praise for his characterisation and the physicality he brought to the roles.

Enoch returned to the West End in the 2018 revival of Red at Wyndham's Theatre, starring alongside Alfred Molina. And also in 2018, he played Aeneas, in BBC ONE & Netflix TV miniseries Troy: Fall of a City.

The following year, Enoch took the leading role 'Jamie McCain' in BBC drama Trust Me, series 2.

In 2020, Enoch returned for two episodes of How to Get Away with Murders sixth season but in the separate role of the adult version of Christopher Castillo, Wes' son.

In 2021, he played Romeo in a production of Romeo and Juliet at the Globe Theatre in London, and he also played Raych Seldon in Apple TV+ science fiction series Foundation.

Enoch returned to the special featuring Harry Potter 20th Anniversary: Return to Hogwarts in 2022. He will also be embarking on a new career exploration as the Dramaturg for Shades of Blue at Sadler's Wells in May 2022.

Theatre

Filmography

Film

Television

Audio

Video games

Audiobook

Audio drama

Awards and nominations

References

External links

Living people
1988 births
21st-century English male actors
21st-century Brazilian male actors
Alumni of The Queen's College, Oxford
Black British male actors
Brazilian people of Barbadian descent
Brazilian people of English descent
British actors of Latin American descent
English male film actors
English male television actors
English people of Barbadian descent
English people of Brazilian descent
Male actors from London
People from Westminster